Jethwa (or Jethva, Jaitwa, Jethi) is a clan of Rajputs and Koli castes of Gujarat.

See also 

Rathwa
Porbandar State

Origin

It has been suggested that the Saindhava dynasty ruling eastern part of Saurashtra peninsula is now represented by the present day Jethwa dynasty. It is also suggested that the term Jethwa probably originating from Jayadratha (another name of Saindhawa dynasty), Jyeshtha (the elder branch) or Jyeshthuka from which the region derived its name Jyeshthukadesha.

Other details and Kuldevis

The Jethwa Rajputs belong to the Gautam/Vajas Gotra and their Kuldevi is Vindhyavasini Devi. Jethwas also worship Brahmani. Again there is one aspect of devi, who is known as Jethwa Mata, who is identified as Gaur Matas or clan deities.

References 

Suryavansha
Hindu dynasties
History of Gujarat
Rajput clans of Gujarat